is a Japanese dumpling made from rice flour mixed with uruchi rice flour and glutinous rice flour. It is different from the method of making mochi, which is made after steaming glutinous rice. Dango is usually finished round shaped, three to five dango are often served on a skewer (skewered dango pieces called ). Generally, dango comes under the category of wagashi, and is often served with green tea. It is eaten year-round, but the different varieties are traditionally eaten in given seasons.

Types
The many different varieties of dango are usually named after the various seasonings served on or with it.

Popular dango
 is commonly covered with sweetened red bean paste; ingredients other than azuki are used on rare occasions. Other toppings for anko include  made from edamame paste and kurumi (walnut) paste.
 is green tea (matcha) flavored dango.
 is a kind of baked dango and is seasoned with soy sauce. Furthermore, the one wrapped with nori is called .
 is covered with sesame paste. It is both sweet and salty.
It has three colors (pink, green, white), and is traditionally made during sakura-viewing season, hence the name (hanami means "flower viewing"; hana meaning "flower", and mi meaning "to see"). The order of the three colored dumplings is said to represent the order in which cherry blossoms bloom. Pink represents cherry buds, white represents cherry blossoms in full bloom, and green represents leafy cherry blossoms after they have fallen.
 is made with millet flour. This variety is prominently featured in the tale of Momotarō, a folkloric Japanese hero, who offers the rounded ball (not skewered) to three talking animals in exchange for their aid in fighting demons.
 is made with toasted soy flour.
 is mixed leaves of yomogi, like kusa mochi. It is often covered with anko.
 is covered with a syrup made from shouyu (soy sauce), sugar, and starch.
 is produced and eaten primarily in Niigata Prefecture. Sasa dango has two varieties: onna dango and otoko dango. Onna dango (literally "female dango") is filled with anko, while the otoko dango (literally "male dango") is filled with kinpira. The dango is wrapped in leaves of sasa for the purpose of preservation.
 is eaten in anmitsu or mitsumame.
 is white dango to eat during Tsukimi. It is traditionally made during autumn full moon (Mid-Autumn Festival).

Various other dango
 has three colors.  One is colored by red beans, the second by eggs, and the third by green tea. Botchan dango is a product name of Ehime’s miyagegashi, which was named after Natsume Sōseki’s novel Botchan. 
 is a slightly sweet, light treat usually eaten as a dessert.
 from Hokkaido is made from potato flour and baked with sweet boiled beans.
 is coated in chestnut paste.
 is a type of Japanese meatball. Chicken niku dango is called tsukune, served on a skewer.

Derived terms
A common Japanese proverb  refers to a preference for practical things rather than aesthetics.

A hairstyle consisting of dango-like buns on either side of the head is sometimes known as odango.

Dorodango is a Japanese art form in which earth and water are molded to create a delicate, shiny sphere, resembling a billiard ball.

In Vietnam 
Bánh hòn is a specialty dessert of Phan Thiet. The cake is made from tapioca flour, coconut, roasted peanuts, salt and sugar. When finished, it is rolled over shredded coconut and skewered like Japanese dango.

Unicode character
The Unicode emoji character 🍡 is used to resemble hanami dango. The character was introduced in October 2010.

See also

 Jian dui
 Wagashi, traditional Japanese confectionery

References

Dumplings
Japanese rice dishes
Skewered foods
Wagashi